Henry Francis Naphen (August 14, 1852 – June 8, 1905) was a U.S. Representative from Massachusetts.

Born in Ireland (then a part of the U.K.), to John and Jane (Henry) Naphen, Naphen immigrated to the United States with his parents, who settled in Lowell, Massachusetts.
He was educated by private tutors and also attended the public schools.
He was graduated from Harvard University in 1878.
He attended the Boston University Law School.
He was admitted to the bar at Suffolk County in November 1879 and commenced practice in Boston.

Boston School Committee
He served as member of the school committee of Boston 1882-January 1886.

While on the School Committee Naphen served on the standing committees on the Horace Mann School, Sewing, and The Normal School.

Naphen served as member of the Massachusetts State Senate in 1885 and 1886, for the Fifth Suffolk District.  Naphen was appointed bail commissioner by the justices of the superior court.

He was a member of the Ancient and Honorable Artillery Company of Massachusetts.

Congressional Elections
Naphen was elected as a Democrat to the  Fifty-sixth and  Fifty-seventh Congresses (March 4, 1899 – March 3, 1903).

1898 Election

The 1898 election was a two way race between Naphen and incumbent Republican Congressman Samuel J. Barrows, Naphen won the election garnering 17,149 votes to Barrows' total of 13,909.

1902 Election
Naphen wanted to run again in 1902 however William S. McNary, chairman of the Democratic State committee wanted the nomination and McNary forced Naphen to retire from the race.  As McNary controlled the apparatus of the district's Democratic party Naphen decided to quietly drop out of the race rather than after a fight.

He died in Boston, June 8, 1905 and was interred in Calvary Cemetery.

References

Footnotes

1852 births
1905 deaths
Harvard University alumni
Boston University School of Law alumni
Boston School Committee members
Democratic Party Massachusetts state senators
Democratic Party members of the United States House of Representatives from Massachusetts
19th-century American politicians